Liu Piguang (died 154 BC) was the ninth son of Liu Fei and grandson of Emperor Gaozu of Han.  When Liu Ze, Prince of Qi, died without an heir in 165 BC, Emperor Wen of Han divided the Qi territory in the land among the living sons of Liu Fei. In 164, Piguang was named Prince of Jinan and received part of the former Qi land. In 154 BC, he joined the Rebellion of the Seven States initiated by Liu Pi, Prince of Wu.  Piguang was defeated and killed in battle with generals Dou Ying and Zhou Yafu. His land was returned to Han and his title was abolished.

References

154 BC deaths
Han dynasty imperial princes
Year of birth unknown